Pioneer Terra is a region on the dwarf planet Pluto, north of Tombaugh Regio and east of Voyager Terra. It was discovered by the New Horizons spacecraft on 14 July 2015. It is named for the Pioneer program, which included Pioneer 10 and Pioneer 11, the first spacecraft to cross the asteroid belt and explore Jupiter and Saturn, as well as the first to explore the outer Solar System; Pioneer 6, 7, 8, and 9, which formed an "interplanetary weather network"; Pioneer 1 through 5, which explored the Moon in various ways; and the Pioneer Venus project, consisting of a probe and orbiter to Venus.

References

Regions of Pluto